Paul Dana (April 15, 1975 – March 26, 2006) was an American racing driver in the IndyCar Series.

Early life
Born in St. Louis, Missouri, Dana graduated from the Medill School of Journalism at Northwestern University. Before becoming a race driver, he worked as a mechanic, a private racing coach, a driving instructor, and a PR & marketing account representative. He also was an editor and journalist covering motorsport, his writing having appeared in AutoWeek, Sports Illustrated and Maxim.

Racing career

In 1996, Dana was working as a mechanic at the Bridgestone Racing School in Ontario when he won his first races there. In 1998 he moved to Indianapolis and began competing in Barber Dodge Pro Series, and his top 20 finish earned him an invitation to the inaugural Formula Dodge National Championship. He then competed in the Infiniti Pro Series where he captured one race win and placed second in the 2004 championship. He then secured sponsorship to run in the IndyCar Series with sponsorship from Ethanol suppliers, which he brought to Hemelgarn Racing.

After competing in three IndyCar Series events, Dana suffered a spinal fracture while practicing for the 2005 Indianapolis 500 and missed the rest of the season, replaced by Jimmy Kite. He returned to the series to race for Rahal Letterman Racing after he recovered from his injuries.

Death

In the practice session for the first race of the 2006 IndyCar Series season, at Homestead-Miami Speedway, Dana collided with Ed Carpenter's disabled car after Carpenter's tire went flat, thrusting Carpenter's car into a retaining wall, before it slid to the bottom of the track. Dana, in the Rahal-Letterman car, was told to "go low" by his spotter. Slow-motion footage showed that Dana had hit debris from Carpenter's car just before impact.

Dana was transported to Jackson Memorial Hospital, where he died due to complications from injuries sustained in the crash. He was 30 years old, and was survived by his wife Tonya. The morning of his death, Dana's wife found out she was expecting their first child.

After his death, Dana's teammates Buddy Rice and Danica Patrick did not compete in the race as a mark of respect for their deceased teammate.

During a show on March 27, 2006, an emotional David Letterman paused during his monologue to offer his condolences to Dana's family:It's not hard to imagine the despair and sorrow that Paul Dana's wife, Tonya, and the rest of his family are feeling now, and I want them to know that they have the thoughts and the prayers of myself, the entire Rahal-Letterman team, and the entire racing community and, hopefully, that will give them the slightest amount of comfort. I did not know Paul personally but we were all proud to have him on our team and are deeply saddened by his tragic passing at such a young age.

Racing record

American open-wheel racing results
(key) (Races in bold indicate pole position)

Indy Lights

IndyCar Series

References

I.R.L. Rookie Dies After Prerace Collision  by Dave Caldwell and Charlie Nobles, New York Times, March 27, 2006. Retrieved 2013-7-07.

External links 
Paul Dana official site

1975 births
2006 deaths
United States Formula Three Championship drivers
IndyCar Series drivers
Indy Lights drivers
24 Hours of Daytona drivers
Medill School of Journalism alumni
Sportspeople from St. Louis
Racing drivers from Missouri
Racing drivers from St. Louis
Racing drivers who died while racing
Sports deaths in Florida
U.S. F2000 National Championship drivers
Rahal Letterman Lanigan Racing drivers